The Milan Triennial (Triennale di Milano) is an art and design exhibition that takes place every three years at the Triennale di Milano Museum in Milan, Italy.

History
The exhibition was originally established in 1923 as a biennial architecture and industrial design event. The first five editions took place in Monza. In 1933 the exhibition was relocated to Milan and the format was changed to a triennial basis. The designated venue was the new Palazzo dell’Arte designed by architect Giovanni Muzio, featuring Gio Ponti's Torre Branca.

The Triennial was recognised by the Bureau of International Expositions (BIE) in 1933.

With Ponti and artist Mario Sironi at the helm, the 5th Triennale expanded its field to visual art, with mural paintings made by artists such as Giorgio de Chirico, Massimo Campigli and Carlo Carrà.

Other artists who exhibited their work at the Triennial over the years include Lucio Fontana, Enrico Baj, Arturo Martini, Gio Pomodoro, Alberto Burri, Mario Merz, Giulio Paolini and Michelangelo Pistoletto.

The Triennial was discontinued three times in 1940, 1973 and 1996.

List of triennials

References

External links
 A blog article with many images from several triennials

Triennial events
World's fairs in Milan
1923 establishments in Italy
Art festivals in Italy
Art exhibitions in Italy
Contemporary art exhibitions
Culture in Milan
Recurring events established in 1923
Festivals established in 1923
Arts organisations based in Italy
Festivals in Milan